The Munster Senior League Senior Premier Division is the top division of the Munster Senior League. It is organized by the Munster Football Association. Together with the Leinster Senior League Senior Division and the Ulster Senior League Senior Division, it forms the third level of the Republic of Ireland football league system. Clubs from this division play in the Munster Senior Cup, the FAI Cup, and the FAI Intermediate Cup. In recent seasons the winners of the Senior Division have also been invited to play in the League of Ireland Cup. Avondale United and UCC represented the division in 2014 and 2015 respectively.

2019–20 teams

History

Early years
The original Munster Football Association was founded in 1901 and it is believed that a Munster League was founded within a few years. The 1909–10 season saw six teams representing the Highland Light Infantry, the Royal Welch Fusiliers, the Durham Light Infantry, the Sherwood Foresters, the King's Regiment and Haulbowline all playing in the Munster League First Division. In the Munster Cup the Highland Light Infantry lost 1–0 to the Royal Welsh Fusilers in the final played at Turner's Cross. However this league was effectively disbanded during the First World War and Irish War of Independence era. In 1921 Harry Buckle, a former Ireland international, settled in  Cork and began working for the Ford Motor Company. Finding little or no association football activity in the city, Buckle initially founded Fordsons F.C. and then helped found the County Cork–based South Munster League for the team to play in. In addition to playing and coaching with the new club, Buckle also served as president of the Tipperary/Limerick based – North Munster League and helped reform the Munster Football Association. By 1922–23 the South Munster League and North Munster Leagues had effectively merged to become the Munster Senior League. Barrackton United of the South Munster League became the first post–First World War  Munster Senior League champions after defeating Cahir Park F.C. of the North Munster League in a play-off.

List of winners by season

Notes

References   

3
Munster Senior League (association football)
Ire
1
Professional sports leagues in Ireland